Bojcza is a Polish coat of arms. It was used by several szlachta families.

History

Blazon

Notable bearers
Notable bearers of this coat of arms include: Zwolinski

See also
 Polish heraldry
 Heraldic family
 List of Polish nobility coats of arms

Bibliography
 Kasper Niesiecki, Jan Nepomucen Bobrowicz: Herbarz polski Kaspra Niesieckiego S. J. T. 3. Lipsk: Breitkopf i Haertel, 1841, s. 262.
 Tadeusz Gajl: Herbarz polski od średniowiecza do XX wieku : ponad 4500 herbów szlacheckich 37 tysięcy nazwisk 55 tysięcy rodów. L&L, 2007. .
 Józef Szymański: Herbarz średniowiecznego rycerstwa polskiego. Warszawa: PWN, 1993, s. 190. .
 Józef Szymański: Herbarz rycerstwa polskiego z XVI wieku. Warszawa: DiG, 2001, s. 178. .

External links
 Bojcza i lista nazwisk w elektronicznej wersji Herbarza polskiego Tadeusza Gajla
 Strona internetowa Jankowskich herbu Bojcza

Polish coats of arms